The men's 3000 metres steeplechase event at the 1990 Commonwealth Games was held on 28 January at the Mount Smart Stadium in Auckland.

Results

References

3000
1990